Travis Stevens (born February 28, 1986) is an American judoka and Brazilian jiu-jitsu practitioner who competed in the 2008, 2012, and 2016 Summer Olympics.  He competes in the men's half-middleweight (−81 kg) division. On August 9, 2016, Stevens became the third American male judoka to win a silver medal in the Olympics.

Career
An early start at the age of 6 enabled him to acquire a vast amount of knowledge in Judo and other martial arts. Travis is an outstanding athlete in the disciplines of Judo and Brazilian jiu-jitsu, and holds many accomplishments in both. He is currently ranked number 12 in the world in the −81 kg weight class by the International Judo Federation (as of 9 August 2016).

At the 2008 Summer Olympics, he lost to eventual gold medalist Ole Bischof in the third round, before losing to Tiago Camilo in the repechage.

At the 2012 Summer Olympics he again lost to 2008 gold medalist Ole Bischof, this time in the semi-finals by judges' decision.  Stevens was then beaten in the bronze medal match by Canada's Antoine Valois-Fortier.

At the 2016 Summer Olympics, he lost to Khasan Khalmaurzaev (Russia) in the finals, earning a silver medal.

Stevens primarily teaches out of FUJI Gym in Wakefield, Massachusetts, which he opened on January 12, 2013. Travis also holds a black belt in Brazilian jiu-jitsu under John Danaher and Renzo Gracie, which Danaher awarded on November 19, 2013. He trains at the Renzo Gracie Academy in New York City with several elite athletes. Travis also teaches at Renzo Gracie Fort Lee in New Jersey.

References

External links
 
 
 

American male judoka
American practitioners of Brazilian jiu-jitsu
1986 births
Living people
Sportspeople from Bellevue, Washington
Pan American Games gold medalists for the United States
Judoka at the 2008 Summer Olympics
Judoka at the 2012 Summer Olympics
Judoka at the 2016 Summer Olympics
Olympic judoka of the United States
Olympic bronze medalists for the United States in judo
Medalists at the 2016 Summer Olympics
Pan American Games medalists in judo
Judoka at the 2015 Pan American Games
Medalists at the 2015 Pan American Games